The University of Economics – Varna is a public university located in Varna, Bulgaria, focused on studies in the field of economics. The University has an accreditation issued by the National Evaluation and Accreditation Agency.

The University is a higher educational institution with long history and its own traditions. It was founded on May 14, 1920 and was originally known as the Higher School of Commerce. It is the oldest university for economic sciences in Varna region and the second one in Bulgaria after Sofia University, which was founded in 1888. There are over 11,000 students at UE-Varna, including foreign students.

There are four faculties (Finance and Accounting, Economics, Computer Science, Management), Language Department and College of Tourism at the University of Economics – Varna. Students can obtain additional specialization and widen professional skills by completing short-term or long-term courses and language classes offered by the Lifelong Learning Center.

The University building is located next to the Sea Garden. The building has become a symbol of the city. In 2015 UE-Varna building was awarded a prize Building of the Year 2015. The facade reflects the influence of the French Renaissance and partly the classical Western European Baroque. The pediment placed above the main entrance is a masterpiece of the sculptor Kiril Shivarov. It is decorated by the images of two Greek gods: Hermes holding in his left hand a rod of merchants and Athena - a goddess of wisdom with an open book on her knees.

Learning Structure

Faculty of Finance and Accounting 
Departments:
 Accounting
 Finance
 General Economic Theory
 Law Science

Faculty of Economics 
Departments:
 Economics and Construction Management
 Industrial Business
 Economics and Management of Trade
 Commodity 
 Agricultural Economics

Faculty of Informatics 
Departments:
 Informatics
 Statistics and Applied Mathematics
 Physical Education and Sport

Faculty of Management 
Departments:
 Management and administration
 Marketing
 Economics and Organization of Tourism
 International Economic Relations
 Social sciences and humanities

Department of Language Learning 
Departments:
 Western European languages
 Slavic languages

Specialties

Bachelor programmes 

Bachelor programmes comprise 4 years of study which include practical training, opportunities for double degree programmes, Erasmus+ and CEEPUS mobilities, etc.

Taught in Bulgarian

There are twenty-nine accredited programmes in four professional fields: Economics, Administration and Management, Tourism and Informatics and Computer Science:

Taught in English

Taught in Russian

There is an opportunity for acquiring a second bachelor's degree in International Management (180 ECTS) from Worms University of Applied Sciences, Germany and in International Business (210 ECTS) from Seinäjoki University of Applied Sciences, Finland.

Master programmes 

Master's degree programmes are offered in English or in Bulgarian.

Taught in Bulgarian  

Taught in English

PhD programmes 

Master's degree graduates are eligible for a doctoral degree. It is done in five professional fields: Economics, Administration and Management, Tourism, Informatics and Computer Science and Law. The University of Economics – Varna offers the following PhD programmes in Bulgarian and English:

UE-Varna aims to evolve the academic environment, internationalization and the diversity of cultural life. Integration into the European Union's education system contributes to the quality and efficiency of education. The University offers variety of exchange opportunities through Erasmus+ programme, CEEPUS, EEA grants and agreements with the partner universities from around the globe.

Double-degree programmes for both bachelor's and master's degree students are available at UE-Varna. Bilateral agreements with the universities in the UK, Russia, Finland, Germany, India give the students the opportunity to invest in their academic, professional and life experience.

References

External links 

 International Relations Office
 Bachelor Programmes
 Master Programmes 
 PhD Programmes 
 Practical Information 
 FAQ

Educational institutions established in 1920
Business schools in Europe
Economics
1920 establishments in Bulgaria